Apolipoprotein AI (ApoA-I) is a protein that in humans is encoded by the APOA1 gene. As the major component of HDL particles, it has a specific role in lipid metabolism.

Structure
APOA1 is located on chromosome 11, with its specific location being 11q23-q24. The gene contains 4 exons. The encoded apolipoprotein A-I, is a 28.1 kDa protein composed of 243 amino acids; 21 peptides have been observed through mass spectrometry data.

Function
Apolipoprotein AI is the major protein component of high density lipoprotein (HDL) particles in plasma.

Chylomicrons secreted from the intestinal enterocyte also contain apo-AI, but it is quickly transferred to HDL in the bloodstream.

The protein, as a component of HDL particles, enables efflux of fat molecules by accepting fats from within cells (including macrophages within the walls of arteries which have become overloaded with ingested fats from oxidized LDL particles) for transport (in the water outside cells) elsewhere, including back to LDL particles or to the liver for excretion.

It is a cofactor for lecithin—cholesterol acyltransferase (LCAT) which is responsible for the formation of most plasma cholesteryl esters. Apolipoprotein AI has also been isolated as a prostacyclin (PGI2) stabilizing factor, and thus may have an anticlotting effect. Defects in the gene encoding it are associated with HDL deficiencies, including Tangier disease, and with systemic non-neuropathic amyloidosis.

ApoA-I is often used as a biomarker for prediction of cardiovascular diseases. The ratio apoB-100/apoA-I (i.e. LDL & larger particles vs. HDL particles), NMR measured lipoprotein (low density lipoprotein (LDL)/(HDL) particle ratios even more so, has always had a stronger correlation with myocardial infarction event rates than older methods of measuring lipid transport in the water outside cells.

ApoA-I is routinely measured using immunoassays such as ELISA or nephelometry.

Applications  
ApoA-I can be used to create in vitro lipoprotein nanodiscs for cell-free membrane expression systems.

Clinical significance

Activity associated with high HDL-C and protection from heart disease 

As a major component of the high-density lipoprotein complex (protective "fat removal" particles), apoA-I helps to clear fats, including cholesterol, from white blood cells within artery walls, making the white blood cells (WBCs) less likely to become fat overloaded, transform into foam cells, die and contribute to progressive atheroma.  Five of nine men found to carry a mutation (E164X) who were at least 35 years of age had developed premature coronary artery disease. One of four mutants of apoA-I is present in roughly 0.3% of the Japanese population, but is found in 6% of those with low HDL cholesterol levels.

ApoA-I Milano is a naturally occurring mutant of apoA-I, found in a few families in Limone sul Garda, Italy, and, by genetic + church record family tree detective work, traced to a single individual, Giovanni Pomarelli, in the 18th century. Described in 1980, it was the first known molecular abnormality of apolipoproteins. Paradoxically, carriers of this mutation have very low HDL-C (HDL-Cholesterol) levels, but no increase in the risk of heart disease, often living to age 100 or older. This unusual observation was what lead Italian investigators to track down what was going on and lead to the discovery of apoA-I Milano (the city, Milano, ~160 km away, in which the researcher's lab was located). Biochemically, apo A1 contains an extra cysteine bridge, causing it to exist as a homodimer or as a heterodimer with apo A-II.  However, the enhanced cardioprotective activity of this mutant (which likely depends on fat & cholesterol efflux) cannot easily be replicated by other cysteine mutants.

Recombinant ApoA-1 Milano dimers formulated into liposomes can reduce atheromas in animal models by up to 30%. Apo A1 Milano has also been shown in small clinical trials to have a statistically significant effect in reducing (reversing) plaque build-up on arterial walls.

In human trials the reversal of plaque build-up was measured over the course of five weeks.

Novel haplotypes within apolipoprotein AI-CIII-AIV gene cluster
Lately, two novel susceptibility haplotypes i.e. P2-S2-X1 and P1-S2-X1 have been discovered in ApoAI-CIII-AIV gene cluster on chromosome 11q23, which confer approximately threefold higher risk of coronary heart disease in normal as well as in the patients having non-insulin diabetes mellitus.

Role in other diseases 

A G/A polymorphism in the promoter of the APOA1 gene has been associated with the age at which Alzheimer disease is presented. Protection from Alzheimer's disease by apo-AI may rely on a synergistic interaction with alpha-tocopherol.
Amyloid deposited in the knee following surgery consists largely of apo-AI secreted from chondrocytes (cartilage cells). A wide variety of amyloidosis symptoms are associated with rare APOA1 mutants.

Apo-AI binds to lipopolysaccharide or endotoxin, and has a major role in the anti-endotoxin function of HDL.

In one study, a decrease in Apo-AI levels was detected in schizophrenia patients' CSF, brain and peripheral tissues.

Epistatic impact of apo A1 
Apolipoprotein A1 and APOE interact epistatically to modulate triglyceride levels in coronary heart disease patients. Individually, neither apo A1 nor apo E was found to be associated with triglyceride (TG) levels, but pairwise epistasis (additive x additive model) explored their significant synergistic contributions with raised TG levels (P<0.01).

Factors affecting apo A1 activity 

Apo-A1 production is decreased by calcitriol, and increased by a drug that antagonizes it.

Exercise or statin treatment may cause an increase in HDL-C levels by inducing apo A1 production, but this depends on the G/A promoter polymorphism.

Interactions 
Apolipoprotein A1 has been shown to interact with:
 ABCA1 
 GPLD1
 PLTP

Potential binding partners
Apolipoprotein A1 binding precursor, a relative of APOA-1 abbreviated APOA1BP, has a predicted biochemical interaction with Carbohydrate Kinase Domain Containing Protein. The relationship between these two proteins is substantiated by cooccurance across genomes and coexpression. The ortholog of CARKD in E. coli contains a domain not present in any eukaryotic ortholog. This domain has a high sequence identity to APOA1BP. CARKD is a protein of unknown function, and the biochemical basis for this interaction is unknown.

Interactive pathway map

See also 
 Apolipoprotein B
 Cardiovascular disease
 ApoA-1 Milano

References

External links 
 
 Applied Research on Apolipoprotein-A1
 
 
 

Apolipoproteins

zh:载脂蛋白